The Quarterly Journal of Economics is a peer-reviewed academic journal published by the Oxford University Press for the Harvard University Department of Economics. Its current editors-in-chief are Robert J. Barro, Lawrence F. Katz, Nathan Nunn, Andrei Shleifer, and Stefanie Stantcheva.

History
It is the oldest professional journal of economics in the English language,
and covers all aspects of the field—from the journal's traditional emphasis on micro-theory to both empirical and theoretical macroeconomics.

Reception
According to the Journal Citation Reports, the journal has a 2015 impact factor of 6.662, ranking it first out of 347 journals in the category "Economics". It is generally regarded as one of the top 5 journals in economics, together with the American Economic Review, Econometrica, the Journal of Political Economy, and the Review of Economic Studies.

Notable papers
Some of the most influential and well-read papers in economics have been published in the Quarterly Journal of Economics including:
 "Distribution as Determined by a Law of Rent" (1891), by John B. Clark
 "The Positive Theory of Capital and Its Critics" (1895), by Eugen von Böhm-Bawerk
 "Petty's Place in the History of Economic Theory" (1900), by Charles Henry Hull
 "Fallacies in the Interpretation of Social Cost" (1924), by Frank H. Knight
 "The General Theory of Employment" (1937), by John Maynard Keynes (an expansion on Keynes' General Theory)
 "The Interpretation of Voting in the Allocation of Economic Resources" (1943), by Howard Rothmann Bowen
 "A Contribution to the Theory of Economic Growth" (1956), by Robert Solow
 "The Market for "Lemons": Quality Uncertainty and the Market Mechanism" (1970), by George Akerlof
 "Job Market Signaling" (1973), by Michael Spence
 "Equilibrium in Competitive Insurance Markets: The economics of markets with imperfect information" (1976), by Michael Rothschild and Joseph Stiglitz 
 "A Reformulation of the Economic Theory of Fertility" (1988), by Robert Barro and Gary Becker
 "A Theory of Competition among Pressure Groups for Political Influence" (1983), by Gary Becker
 "A Contribution to the Empirics of Economic Growth" (1992), by N. Gregory Mankiw, David Romer, and David N. Weil
 "Golden Eggs and Hyperbolic Discounting" (1997), by David Laibson
 "Does Social Capital Have An Economic Payoff? A Cross-Country Investigation" (1997) by Stephen Knack and Philip Keefer
 "A Theory of Fairness, Competition, and Cooperation" (1999), by Ernst Fehr and Klaus M. Schmidt
 "Monetary Policy Rules And Macroeconomic Stability: Evidence And Some Theory" (2000), by Richard Clarida, Jordi Galí, and Mark Gertler
 "Information Technology, Workplace Organization, and the Demand for Skilled Labor: Firm-Level Evidence" (2002) by Timothy F. Bresnahan, Erik Brynjolfsson and Lorin M. Hitt

References

External links
Official homepage

English-language journals
Economics journals
Publications established in 1886
Quarterly journals
Oxford University Press academic journals
Harvard University academic journals